Mehdi Mirza Mehdi Tehrani (Persian: مهدی تهرانی) (born March 13, 1970 in Tehran) is an Iranian journalist, historian, film critic, and a former Marines and Commando in the Iran-Iraq War. As an academic journalist and film critic, he usually wrote for two Iranian newspapers: Ettela'at and Hamshahri.

In addition to 3 decades of film critic and historiography in the of film and cinema, he is currently a professor of film studies at the University of Tehran Fine Arts Campus. From September 23, 2020, to November 20, 2021, he was a member of the age rating council of the film of the Iran cinema organization.

Mehdi Mirza Mehdi Tehrani is the commander of the 1st Battalion of the Diver Ranger Unit and is one of the 17 surviving veterans of this 500-member unit in Operation Karbala-4 in the Iran-Iraq War.

Academic background 
Mirza Mehdi Tehrani learned the basics of intervening in translation and historiography with Reza Seyed Hosseini. Also notable are  Arthur Asa Berger, Akbar Alemi, Arthur Knight, and Christian Ross.

He holds a PhD in Film and Visual Media Studies (thesis title: The Impact of Local Journalism on British Cinema in the Last Two Years of World War II Supervisor: Christine Ross, Arthur Asa Berger) from McGill University Faculty of Arts.

Military background in the Iran-Iraq war 
Mehdi Tehrani, commander of the 1st Division of the Diver Commando Unit and one of the few survivors of this unit in Operation Karbala 4, the youngest and last commander of the Kamil Battalion of the 27th Mohammad Rasulullah Division in the Iran-Iraq War, 55% chemical veteran and senior researcher and author Oral history is war.

References 

1970 births
Iranian male writers
University of Tehran alumni
Iranian military personnel of the Iran–Iraq War
Iranian film critics
People from Tehran
Iranian journalists
McGill University alumni
Academic staff of the University of Tehran
Living people